Michaela Shiloh (born January 25, 1992), known professionally as Mickey Shiloh, is an American songwriter, recording artist, and entrepreneur. She was signed as an artist and songwriter to Rodney "Darkchild" Jerkins from 2009 until 2011 and has written songs for artists such as Janet Jackson, Pitbull, Britney Spears, Cassie Ventura, Travis Garland, Jake Miller and Christina Milian.

Artistry & Entrepreneurship
Since 2011, Mickey has released over 40 albums independently. One of her most popular songs, "Drunk On The Mic" was popularized by social media star Kylie Jenner in January 2016. She is the CEO & founder of both BDRM Records and HRDRV. HRDRV is the world's first subscription-based independent record label, providing creative services and community to a collective of singers, songwriters, and producers around the world.

Albums
 Dear Future (2011)
 In The Garden Of My Mind (2012)
 Chill Out (2013)
 20fifteen (2015)
 Summer Wasted (2017)
 SadSongs (2017)
 Fears. (2017)
 Psych Ward Moves (2017)
 RNDM 1 – 666 (6 part EP series)
 Organix (2017)
 2 Weeks Notice (2018)
 Been Awhile (2018)
 No Titles (2019)
 WARP (2019)
 Horror Stories (2019)
 VOSE ST. (2019)
 20nineteen (2019)
 20thirteen (2019)
 11:11 (2020)
 20seventeen (2020)
 Amnesia (2020)
 1992 (2020)
 Enjoy The Heartache Part I (2020)
 Cash Over Love Part I (2020)
 I Don't Miss U (2020)
 Self Care (2020)
 Used To (2020)
 Before The World Ends Part I (2020)
 Before The World Ends Part II (2020)
 AQUA (2021)
 Cash Over Love Part I (2021)
 Enjoy The Heartache Part I (2021)
 It Was Never Love (2021)
 SIMP (2021)
 YOUNG MICK (2021)
 Fluid (2021)
 It Was Fun While It Lasted (2022)

Guest Appearances
 "Jump Off" by Twista (produced by Chad Beatz of Tastemaker Music) (2009)
 "Yesterday" by Traxamillion (produced by Traxamillion) (2010)
 "Touch Yourself" by Kevin McCall (2011)
 "Save the World (On the Dance Floor)" by Sonny Fredie Pedersen (2011)
 "Between the Sheetz" by LL Cool J (produced by Soundz & Tricky Stewart) (2013)
 "Burn Slow" by King Los Feat. Wiz Khalifa (produced by Rob Holladay) (2013)
 "Postcards" by King Los (produced by JO A) (2013)
 "Windows" by Big Von Feat. Keak Da Sneak and The Jacka (produced by Traxamillion) (2013)
 "Reasons" by Abstract (produced by Drumma Battalion) (2016)
 "Y&I" by Sinplus (2017)
 "My Wings" by A Day in Venice (composed and produced by Andrej Kralj) (2017)
 "Getaway" by Keys N Krates
 "Repeat" by Panda Eyes (2021)
 "Negative Thoughts" by Panda Eyes

Selected songwriting discography

2008
 "Instant Gratification" by Tracy Williams (produced by Chad Beatz of Tastemaker Music)
 "Diva" by Tracy Williams (produced by Chad Beatz of Tastemaker Music)

2009
 "Jump Off" by Twista (produced by Chad Beatz of Tastemaker Music)
 Make Me by Janet Jackson (produced by Rodney "Darkchild" Jerkins)

2010
 "Take Ova ft. Pitbull" by Shontelle (produced by Tommy Brown, Rodney "Darkchild" Jerkins)
 "Evacuate My Heart" by Shontelle (produced by Rodney "Darkchild" Jerkins)

2011
 "Don't Keep Me Waiting" by Britney Spears (produced by Rodney "Darkchild" Jerkins)
 "Mr. Worldwide" by Pitbull (rapper)
 "Girls Up" by Belle Amie
 "Girls Talkin Bout" by Mindless Behavior (produced by Ronald "Jukebox" Jackson)
 "Just A Friend" by Jasmine Villegas (produced by Tommy Brown)
 "Masquerade" by Jasmine Villegas (produced by Tommy Brown)
 "Glow in the Dark" by Carishma Bela

2012
 Songs for Nickelodeon film & musical, Rags (film) (starring Keke Palmer, Drake Bell, produced by Nick Cannon)
 "Down South" by Iggy Azalea (produced by Diplo & FKi)
 "1–800 Bone" by Iggy Azalea (produced by Diplo & FKi)
 Vocals on "Boing Clash Boom" by Dada Life (written by Jon Asher, Corneér, Engblom, Hård)

2013
 "RockAByeBaby" by Cassie Ventura (produced by Rob Holladay & The Magnificent)
 "Turn Up" by Cassie Ventura (produced by Yung Berg & Young Chop)
 "Between The Sheetz" by LL Cool J Feat. Mickey Shiloh (produced by Soundz & Tricky Stewart)
 "Burn Slow" by King Los Feat. Wiz Khalifa & Mickey Shiloh (produced by Rob Holladay)
 "Postcards" by King Los Feat. Mickey Shiloh (produced by JO A)
 Vocals on "Boing Clash Boom" by Dada Life (Major Lazer Remix)

2014
 "Risk It All" by Helly Luv (produced by G2)
 "Do It Again" by Eleve (produced by Tommy Brown)
 "Dancing with My Girls" by Katlynn Simone (produced by Yonni)

2015
 "I Still Think Of You" by Serayah McNeill (produced by Amir Swain & Trey Banks)
 "Revolution" by Helly Luv (produced by G2)
 "Whatever U Want" by Sade Serena (produced by Andrea Carax)
 "Night" by  Janet Jackson (produced by Jimmy Jam, Terry Lewis, Thomas Lumpkins)

2016
 Shades of Blue by Vic Mensa

2017
 "Love You Right" by Averdeck
 "Back to the Start" by Jake Miller (singer)

2018
 "Metaphysical" by Vic Mensa
 Miss World 2018 | Dances of The World

2019
 "We Need To Talk" by Tayla Parx
 Soundtrack for Sherwood (TV Series)
 "Teach Me" by Cassie Ventura

Forbes 30 Under 30
In November 2018, Shiloh was listed on Forbes 30 Under 30 in Music for the class of 2019, alongside artists like Camila Cabello and Post Malone. In 2020, Shiloh judged Forbes 30 Under 30 in Music (Class of 2020) alongside The Chainsmokers, 21 Savage and Adriana Arce.

Mental Health Advocacy
Shiloh is a prominent advocate for patients' rights, particularly as this applies to the treatment of mental illness. She has struggled with mental health in her own life, speaking very openly about how she overcomes challenges with bipolar disorder.

HRDRV
In April 2019, Mickey Shiloh started the world's first subscription-based record label, HRDRV.

References

External links 
 Official Website
 Instagram
 Facebook
 Twitter
 YouTube

People from San Mateo, California
Living people
1992 births
Singer-songwriters from California
21st-century American singers
Nueva School alumni